Madison Cunningham (born October 14, 1996) is an American singer, songwriter and guitarist. Rolling Stone described her music as "a new spin on West Coast folk-rock, with classical tendencies, electric guitars, jazz-school chord changes and alt-rock strut all living under the same roof". Her 2019 album, Who Are You Now, was nominated for the best Americana album in the 62nd Annual Grammy Awards. Her 2022 album Revealer won the Grammy for Best Folk Album in 2023.

Life and career 
Madison Cunningham was born in Escondido, California, and later moved to Costa Mesa, where she grew up. She is the daughter of a pastor at a local church, and she has four sisters. Influenced by her father, Cunningham started playing guitar when she was seven years old, performing in the church. As a teenager, she met producer Tyler Chester, with whom she made the self-released worship album Authenticity (2014), which she later removed from streaming platforms as she felt it was no longer relatable. About her faith, Cunningham said, "Christianity looks different to me all the time. The phrase that I use with my husband is 'I’m becoming more and more of an agnostic every day.'"

After graduating from high school, Cunningham discovered many influences, such as the Beatles, Joni Mitchell and Bob Dylan. Other inspirations include Radiohead, Fiona Apple, Juana Molina and Jeff Buckley.

In 2017, Cunningham joined the cast of American Public Media's show Live from Here, presented by Chris Thile, of whom she became a frequent collaborator. She also toured with multi-instrumentalist Andrew Bird, being credited for vocals in his 2019 album, My Finest Work Yet.

Who Are You Now, released on August 16, 2019, earned her a Grammy nomination in the following year for best Americana album. In 2020, Cunningham released her third EP, Wednesday, covering songs by Tom Waits, Radiohead, John Mayer and the Beatles. She is currently based in Los Angeles.

On August 3, 2022, the artist made an appearance at NPR's Tiny Desk, playing four songs from her upcoming album Revealer. NPR music contributor Jewly Hight states that Madison was an "audacious guide, steering us toward exploration with the shrewd parts she played on three different guitars over the course of four songs".

On September 9, 2022, Cunningham released Revealer, her third studio album. Consequence'''s editorial coordinator Paolo Ragusa writes about it: "With each song on Revealer, Cunningham is proving that she can satisfy and surprise her audience all at once, and it’s one of the most delightful albums released so far in 2022."

Discography

Studio albums
 Authenticity (2014)
 Who Are You Now (2019)
 Revealer (2022)

Extended plays
 Love, Lose Remember (2017)
 For the Sake of the Rhyme (2019)
 Wednesday'' (2020)

Singles
 "Beauty into Clichés" (2018)
 "All at Once (Solo Version)" (2018)
 "All at Once" (2018)
 "Last Boat to Freedom" (2018)
 "Last Boat to Freedom (Piano Version)" (2018)
 "Location" (2018)
 "Location (Solo Version)" (2018)
 "Pin It Down" (2019)
 "Something to Believe In" (2019)
 "Trouble Found Me" (2019)
 "No One Else to Blame" (2020)
 "Giraffe" (2020)
 "Coming Back" (2020)
 "No Surprises" (2020)
 "In My Life" (2020)
 "The Age of Worry" (2020)
 "Wednesday" (2020)
 "Broken Harvest" (2021)
 "Anywhere" (2022)
 "Hospital" (2022)
 "In from Japan" (2022)

Awards and nominations

References

External links
 Official website
 
 
 

American folk singers
Singer-songwriters from California
Musicians from Orange County, California
People from Costa Mesa, California
American women singer-songwriters
21st-century American women singers
Americana musicians
Living people
1996 births
21st-century American singers
21st-century American guitarists
21st-century women guitarists
21st-century American women guitarists
Musicians from San Diego
Grammy Award winners